"The Rest of My Life" is a song by Canadian rock band Sloan. The song was released as the first single from the band's seventh studio album, Action Pact. The song received notable radio airplay, being the #1 most added single at radio by the Canadian Music Network.

References
 

2003 singles
Sloan (band) songs
2003 songs
Songs written by Chris Murphy (Canadian musician)
RCA Records singles
Song recordings produced by Tom Rothrock
Canadian patriotic songs